Robert Henry Timmons (December 19, 1935 – March 1, 1974) was an American jazz pianist and composer. He was a sideman in Art Blakey's Jazz Messengers for two periods (July 1958 to September 1959; February 1960 to June 1961), between which he was part of Cannonball Adderley's band. Several of Timmons' compositions written when part of these bands – including "Moanin'", "Dat Dere", and "This Here" – enjoyed commercial success and brought him more attention. In the early and mid-1960s he led a series of piano trios that toured and recorded extensively.

Timmons was strongly associated with the soul jazz style that he helped initiate. This link to apparently simple writing and playing, coupled with drug and alcohol addiction, led to a decline in his career. Timmons died, aged 38, from cirrhosis. Several critics have commented that his contribution to jazz remains undervalued.

Early life
Timmons was born in Philadelphia, Pennsylvania, the son of a minister. He had a sister, Eleanor. Both of his parents, and several aunts and uncles, played the piano. From an early age Timmons studied music with an uncle, Robert Habershaw, who also taught McCoy Tyner. Timmons first played at the church where his grandfather was minister; this influenced his later jazz playing. He grew up in the same area as other future musicians, including the Heath brothers (Jimmy, Percy, and Tootie) and Lee Morgan. Timmons' first professional performances were in his local area, often as a trio that included Tootie Heath on drums. After graduating from high school Timmons was awarded a scholarship to study at the Philadelphia Musical Academy.

1954 to spring 1961
Timmons moved to New York in 1954. He played with Kenny Dorham in 1956, making his recording debut with the trumpeter in a live set in May of that year. He went on to play and record with Chet Baker in 1956–57 (bassist Scott LaFaro was part of this band for a time), Sonny Stitt in 1957, and Maynard Ferguson in 1957–58. He also recorded as a sideman with hornmen Curtis Fuller, Hank Mobley, and Morgan. all for Blue Note Records in 1957.

Timmons became best known as a member of Art Blakey's band the Jazz Messengers, which he was first part of from July 1958 to September 1959, including for a tour of Europe. He was recruited for the Messengers by saxophonist Benny Golson, who said that "He was inventive, [...] He could play bebop and he could play funky – he could play a lot of things, and I thought it was the element that Art needed. He hadn't had anybody quite like Bobby, who could go here or go there, rather than walking in a single corridor." By late 1958 Timmons was sharing bandmate Morgan's East Sixth Street apartment and the pair had bought a piano, allowing Timmons to practice and Morgan to work on composing. From around the time he joined Blakey, Timmons, along with some of his fellow band members, was a heroin user. After leaving Blakey, Timmons joined Cannonball Adderley's band, in October 1959.

Timmons was also known as a composer during this period: The Encyclopedia of Jazz states that his compositions "Moanin'" (from the 1958 album of the same title), "This Here", and "Dat Dere" "helped generate the gospel-tinged 'soul jazz' style of [the] late '50s and early '60s." The first was written when Timmons was first with Blakey; the others were composed when he was with Adderley. "This Here" (sometimes "Dis Here") was a surprise commercial success for Adderley: recorded in concert in 1959, it was released as part of The Cannonball Adderley Quintet in San Francisco album while the band was still on tour, and they discovered its popularity only when they arrived back in New York and found crowds outside the Village Gate, where they were due to play.

Timmons was reported to be dissatisfied with the money he had received from "This Here", and was enticed in February 1960 into leaving Adderley and returning to Blakey's band by the offer of more pay. Timmons then appeared on further well-known albums with the drummer, including A Night in Tunisia, The Freedom Rider and The Witch Doctor. His own recording debut as sole leader was This Here Is Bobby Timmons in 1960, which contained his first versions of his best-known compositions. In the same year, he played on recordings led by Nat Adderley, Arnett Cobb, and Johnny Griffin, among others; on the first of these, Work Song, Timmons did not appear on all of the tracks, because he had been drinking heavily.

Summer 1961 to 1974
Timmons left Blakey for the second time in June 1961, encouraged by the success of his compositions, including jukebox plays of "Dat Dere", which Oscar Brown had recorded after adding lyrics. Timmons then formed his own bands, initially with Ron Carter on bass and Tootie Heath on drums. They toured around the US, including the West Coast, but played most in and around New York. In the initial stages of this trio, Timmons liked the group sounds of the trios led by Red Garland and Ahmad Jamal. According to Tootie Heath, Timmons was at the peak of his fame at that point, but was addicted to heroin, and used a lot of the money that the band was paid maintaining his habit.

In 1963, Timmons' playing, with Lewis Powers on bass and Ron McCurdy on drums, was described by a Washington Post reviewer as "flexible and adventuresome [...] Glossing over everything is an undeniable sheen of church music and spirituals." In 1965, the same reviewer commented that Timmons was employing musicians who were of much lower ability: "Timmons lacks a certain passion but I wonder if this is not the fault of his sidemen." Timmons started playing vibes in the mid-1960s. He occasionally played organ, but recorded only one track on that instrument – a 1964 version of "Moanin'" on From the Bottom. Recordings as a leader continued, usually as part of a trio or quartet, but, after joining Milestone Records around 1967, Timmons' album Got to Get It! featured him as part of a nonet, playing arrangements by Tom McIntosh.

Timmons' career declined quickly in the 1960s, in part because of drug abuse and alcoholism, and partly as a result of being typecast as a composer and player of seemingly simple pieces of music. In 1968 he made his second, final, recording for Milestone, Do You Know the Way? In the following year, he played in a quartet led by Sonny Red, with Dexter Gordon on one of the saxophonist's temporary returns to the US from Europe, and in a trio backing vocalist Etta Jones. Timmons continued to play in the early 1970s, mostly in small groups or in combination with other pianists, and mainly in the New York area.

According to saxophonist Jimmy Heath, Timmons joined Clark Terry's big band for a tour of Europe in 1974. He was unwell and drank on the plane to Sweden, and fell while drinking at the bar before the band's first concert, in Malmö. Susceptible to blood clotting, he was flown back to the US. On March 1, 1974, he died from cirrhosis, at the age of 38, at St Vincent's Hospital in New York. He had been in hospital for a month. He was buried in Philadelphia, and was survived by his wife, Estelle, and son, also Bobby.

Playing style and influence
Timmons was known for using block chords, "a style in which the right hand creates the melody and the left hand moves with the rhythm of the right hand, but does not change voicing except to accommodate the chord changes." His use of them was more aggressive, and less melodic, than that of Red Garland. The Penguin Guide to Jazz suggested that "Timmons' characteristic style was a rolling, gospelly funk, perhaps longer on sheer energy than on harmonic sophistication." In the opinion of Scott Yanow, stylistically, "somehow Bobby Timmons never grew beyond where he was in 1960." Gary Giddins, however, highlighted other facets of Timmons' playing: the "lush [Bud] Powell-inspired ballads, his clear, sharp, unsentimental long lines." Carter also identified Powell as a primary influence on Timmons, and commented that his partner in the trio "was very giving, very loyal, played every night like it was his last chance to get it right."

The funky aspects of Timmons' playing influenced fellow pianists, including Les McCann, Ramsey Lewis, and Benny Green. Timmons is often mentioned as being under-rated; jazz writer Marc Myers commented in 2008 that "today, Timmons' contribution to jazz – as an accompanist, writer, leader and innovator of a new sound – is vastly overlooked and undervalued."

Compositions
Timmons wrote "a steady stream of infectious funky tunes", stated Giddins. Timmons dismissed the idea that he was deliberately a composer: "I'm a dilettante as a composer. I have never consciously sat down and tried to write a song." He stated that his method of composing a new song might involve "whistling, playing around with the notes, or at a club. I'll tell one musician to play this note, another that note, and we kick it around." One account of the creation of "Moanin'" was given by Golson: Timmons had the opening eight bars, which he often played between tunes, but formed the complete song only after Golson encouraged him to add a bridge.

Personality
Tootie Heath reported that, when they were on tour and Timmons was addicted to heroin, the pianist would routinely lie and sometimes pull out a knife to threaten people. Carter, the bassist from that tour, stated that Timmons offered his bandmates a lot of encouragement to experiment and improve from performance to performance, and that he "was a really multi-talented person and he was just a real sweetheart, a sweetheart of a man". In Golson's words, Timmons "had no ego about him, [...] He was always upbeat, never downbeat, and he never maligned anybody unless it was in a humorous way".

Discography

As leader/co-leader

As sideman

Sources:

Notes

References

External links 
Timmons at AllMusic
Timmons at jazzgiants.net

1935 births
1974 deaths
Alcohol-related deaths in New York City
American jazz composers
American jazz pianists
American male pianists
Atlantic Records artists
Cannonball Adderley Quintet members
Capitol Records artists
Deaths from cirrhosis
The Jazz Messengers members
Jazz musicians from Pennsylvania
Mainstream jazz pianists
American male jazz composers
Milestone Records artists
Musicians from Philadelphia
Prestige Records artists
Riverside Records artists
Soul-jazz pianists
20th-century American pianists
20th-century American composers
20th-century jazz composers
20th-century American male musicians